The following is a list of MTV Asia Awards winners for Favorite Artist Taiwan.

MTV Asia Awards
Taiwanese award winners